Religion in Kano State of Nigeria is mainly Islam. The Sharia is valid in the entire state. The Roman Catholic Diocese of Kano has its seat in the state. It stated in Kano State that there is freedom in the practise of religion of Christianity in Kano State. This claim was recently challenged when the Governor of Kano State publicly converted an underaged minor to Islam. The imprisoned atheist Mubarak Bala lives in Kano.

See also 
Nigerian sectarian violence

References

Kano State
Religion in Nigeria